KPOC (1420 AM) is a radio station running Salem Music Network's "Today's Christian Music" format.  Licensed to Pocahontas, Arkansas, United States.  The station is currently owned by Combined Media Group.

References

External links

POC